= Great white heron =

Great white heron may refer to:

- The all-white population of the great blue heron
- Great egret
